Bakhtiar is a village in Tankaman-e Shomali Rural District of Tankaman District, Nazarabad County, Alborz province, Iran. At the 2006 census, its population was 3,064 in 753 households. The latest census in 2016 counted 3,520 people in 1,055 households; it is the largest village in its rural district.

References 

Nazarabad County

Populated places in Alborz Province

Populated places in Nazarabad County